Rabagliati is an Italian surname. Notable people with the surname include:

Alberto Rabagliati (1906–1974), Italian singer
Alexander Rabagliati
Andrea Rabagliati (1843–1930), Scottish physician and writer of Italian descent
Helen Rabagliati MBE (née McLaren, Andrea's wife) (1851–1934), campaigner for improvements in women's health.
Euan Rabagliati (1892–1978), British soldier, pilot, racing driver and intelligence officer
Michel Rabagliati (born 1961), Canadian cartoonist

See also
Rebagliati

Italian-language surnames